SU2 is a suite of open-source software tools written in C++ for the numerical solution of partial differential equations (PDE) and performing PDE-constrained optimization. The primary applications are  computational fluid dynamics and aerodynamic shape optimization, but has been extended to treat more general equations such as electrodynamics and chemically reacting flows. SU2 supports continuous and discrete adjoint for calculating the sensitivities/gradients of a scalar field.

Developers

SU2 is being developed by individuals and organized teams around the world. The SU2 Lead Developers are: Dr. Francisco Palacios and Dr. Thomas D. Economon.

The most active groups developing SU2 are:
 Prof. Juan J. Alonso's group at Stanford University.
 Prof. Piero Colonna's group at Delft University of Technology.
 Prof. Nicolas R. Gauger's group at Kaiserslautern University of Technology.
 Prof. Alberto Guardone's group at Polytechnic University of Milan.
 Prof. Rafael Palacios' group at Imperial College London.

Capabilities
The SU2 tools suite solution suite includes

High-fidelity analysis and adjoint-based design using unstructured mesh technology.
Compressible and incompressible Euler, Navier-Stokes, and  RANS solvers.
Additional PDE solvers for electrodynamics, linear elasticity, heat equation, wave equation and thermochemical non-equilibrium.
Convergence acceleration (multi-grid, preconditioning, etc.).
Sensitivity information via the continuous adjoint methodology approach.
Adaptive, goal-oriented mesh refinement and deformation.
Modularized   C++ object-oriented design.
Parallelization with MPI.
Python scripts for automation.
FEATool Multiphysics features built-in GUI and CLI interfaces for SU2.

Release history

License

SU2 is free and open source software, released under the GNU General Public License version 3 (SU2 v1.0 and v2.0) and GNU Lesser General Public License version 2.1 (SU2 v2.0.7 and later versions).

Alternative software

Free and open-source software
 Advanced Simulation Library (AGPL)
 CLAWPACK
 Code Saturne (GPL)
 FreeFem++
 Gerris Flow Solver (GPL)
 OpenFOAM
 OpenFVM
 Palabos Flow Solver

Proprietary software
 ADINA CFD
 ANSYS CFX
 ANSYS Fluent
 Azore 
 FEATool Multiphysics
 Pumplinx
 STAR-CCM+
 COMSOL Multiphysics
 KIVA (software)
 RELAP5-3D
 PowerFlow
 FOAMpro
 SimScale
 Cradle  SC/Tetra 
 Cradle scSTREAM 
 Cradle Heat Designer

References

External links

Official resources
SU2 home page
SU2 Github repository

Community resources
SU2 Forum at CFD Online
SU2 wiki page at CFD Online

Other resources
SU2 version 2.0 announcement
Tecplot Co-founder review of SU2
Stanford News story about SU2 initial release
FEATool Multiphysics GUI and CFD solver interface for SU2

Computational fluid dynamics
Free science software
Free computer-aided design software
Scientific simulation software
2012 software